Bang Phlu station is a Bangkok MRT station on the Purple Line. The station opened on 6 August 2016 and is located on Rattanathibet road in Nonthaburi Province. The station has four entrances.

References 

MRT (Bangkok) stations